Hasan Aliyev (born 14 November 1989 in Qazakh) is an Azerbaijani World and European champion Greco-Roman wrestler. He competed at the 2012 Summer Olympics in the men's Greco-Roman 60 kg division.  At the 2012 Olympics, he beat Stig-André Berge in the last 16 and Jung Ji-hyun in the quarterfinals before losing to Revaz Lashkhi in the semifinal.  He was entered into the repechage, where he lost his bronze medal match to Zaur Kuramagomedov.

References

Living people
1989 births
Azerbaijani male sport wrestlers
People from Qazax
Wrestlers at the 2012 Summer Olympics
Olympic wrestlers of Azerbaijan
European Games bronze medalists for Azerbaijan
European Games medalists in wrestling
Wrestlers at the 2015 European Games
World Wrestling Championships medalists
World Wrestling Champions
European Wrestling Champions
21st-century Azerbaijani people